Institute of Psychiatry may refer to:

 Institute of Psychiatry, Psychology and Neuroscience, previously known as the Institute of Psychiatry, at King's College London, UK
 Centre for Addiction and Mental Health (College Street site), formerly the Clarke Institute of Psychiatry, in Toronto, Canada
 Institute of Psychiatry and Human Behaviour, Goa Medical College, India
 Max Planck Institute of Psychiatry, Munich, Germany
 Central Institute of Psychiatry, Kanke, India
 Somdet Chaopraya Institute of Psychiatry, Bangkok, Thailand
 Institute of Psychiatry at Ain Shams University Faculty of Medicine, Cairo, Egypt
 Stone Institute of Psychiatry at Northwestern Memorial Hospital, Chicago, U.S.
 Sir Cowasjee Jehangir Institute of Psychiatry, Hyderabad, India
 Institute of Psychiatry at the Benazir Bhutto Hospital, Rawalpindi, Pakistan
 Institute of Psychiatry at MUSC Health Medical Center, Medical University of South Carolina